My Knight and Me is a computer-animated fantasy television series created by Joeri Christiaen. The series is a co-production between TeamTO and Thuristar, in co-production with Canal+ Family and Télétoon+, with the participation of Super RTL and in coproduction with VRT-Ketnet and RTBF-Ouftivi. The series premiered in the US on January 2, 2017, on Cartoon Network and Boomerang in April. It currently airs on Family Channel in Canada. It is based on the animated short film "850 Meters", made by Thuristar and Lunanime.

Premise
The series is set in the Dark Ages, and focuses on Jimmy the Squire, along with his friend, Cat the Princess, and his father, Henri of Orange, a chivalrous knight; as they all embark on fun adventures.

Cast and characters

Main
 Jules de Jongh as Jimmy of Orange the Squire, son and squire of Henri of Orange. Jimmy is an unconventional squire, preferring to use his brain and to innovate rather than follow the tried and true-and questionable-brawn methods of other knights and squires. Jimmy is short for James.
 Kaycie Chase as Cat the Princess, a tomboy princess who likes to tag along with Jimmy and Henri on their adventures. Despite the disapproval of her elders, she dreams of being a knight one day and is quite acrobatic. Cat has two main outfits, often used in each show. One is her "typical princess" outfit, consisting of a full body dress with a chest plate. The other is her "Princess Knight" outfit, which consists of the same but a much shorter skirt and chain mail legs, which appear nearly the same as the other knights and squires. In one episode she modifies her outfit in homage to the Swan, and is dubbed "Little Swan" by the black rats. Cat is short for Catherine.
 David Gasman as Henri of Orange, Jimmy's good-natured but somewhat clueless father. Henri is a supportive father to his eccentric son, though he worries about including Cat on their kingdom-saving adventures. A talented musician, Henri is rarely without his trusty mandolin Mandy and rides into action on his trusty horse Torpedo, and is known for seeking to carry out his duties as a knight without regard for recognition.

Recurring
Jules de Jongh as the Queen, Cat's mother from whom Cat is constantly trying to hide her adventures. Despite her apparent disapproval, the Queen has admitted to being an admirer of the Swan, a black-suited hero from her younger days. It is subsequently revealed that she was in fact the Swan, though she's gotten rusty.
 David Gasman as the Knight of Red, a knight who trains the squires in preparation for eventual knighthood; he evokes a stereotypical gym coach and carries a whistle with him everywhere.
Perlin, the kingdom's resident wizard who is a tad absent-minded.
Colbert, a short, bespectacled monk who handles the assignments of the various knights from the Quest Desk. In "Fearless Colbert" it is revealed that he trained as a knight but failed in the role due to his diminutive size, and ended up in his current career after standing in at the Quest Desk as a youth and maintaining the role by concealing his failure to graduate.
Kaycie Chase as Ronnie Flash, a young boy of Jimmy and Cat's age who is Epic's resident news reporter.
Harriet Carmichael as Lady Fontaine, Cat's teacher at Princess School. She is often frustrated by Cat's tomboyish behavior, while Cat is usually forced to escape her care in order to go on adventures.
Cynthia, a blonde girl in Cat's class at school who wears her hair up; she is usually partnered with Lance when the squires and young ladies have classes together.
Curt, a chubby young boy who is in Lance and Jimmy's class at Knight School; he lacks confidence and is often bullied by Lance, while Jimmy usually comes to his defense.
Bjorn, a young dragon and son of the villainous Bad Jack. Unlike his father, Bjorn displays no real hostility towards the people of Epic and is even friends with Jimmy, occasionally helping him on his adventures.
Christopher Ragland as Wilfred the White, an egotistical knight who cares more about his image than about actually carrying out the duties of a knight. He is the uncle of Lance, who serves as his squire, and is as contemptuous of Henri as his nephew is of Jimmy, though Henri is usually oblivious to Wilfred's taunts and belittling comments. Most of his attempted jabs at Henri's pride come from the House of Orange's coming from peasant stock rather than the traditional nobility-born knights. Wilfred is Epic's first knight, but achieved his position through trickery and seeks to maintain it through devious methods, such as teaming up with the Cursed Forest Witch.
Christopher Ragland as Lance of White, Wilfred's squire and Jimmy's rival. Lance is a rich, spoiled brat who delights in antagonizing Jimmy, particularly when he or Henri does something embarrassing.
Jules de Jongh as the Cursed Forest Witch, an evil witch who once lived in epic but was banished by the Queen; she now seeks to take over the kingdom using her dark magic. A running gag involves her being turned into a frog by her own magic.
David Gasman as Bad Jack, Epic's most fearsome dragon and a frequent antagonist of Jimmy, Cat, and Henri. He spends more time seeking treasure and tormenting the people of Epic than with his son Bjorn, and is also distanced from his vegan, peace-loving brother Jeff.
Christopher Ragland as the Black Rats, a group of human-sized anthropomorphic rats who wear grungy armor and colored masks, the latter being reminiscent of the Teenage Mutant Ninja Turtles (though the rats number five and have members with green and yellow masks but none with an orange one). They often menace travelers, either of their own accord or in alliance with other villains such as the Witch.
The Cyclops, a one-eyed giant who rarely speaks but is an occasional menace to Epic, either of his own accord or as a pawn of other villains such as the Cursed Forest Witch. His greatest distinguishing feature is his obsession with knight armor, which is the primary motivation for most of his rampages.
The Green Venom Witch, one of the various colleagues of the Cursed Forest Witch. At one point she took over the Cursed Forest Witch's hut due to the Cursed Forest Witch's failure to take over Epic, but was later expelled.
Zerlin, aka Bathagalflupe the Dread-Zerlin the wizard's older brother and an evil sorcerer who wishes to rule over Epic. He enjoys using his dark magic to force others to do his bidding, but acknowledges his younger brother as the superior magic user except for Perlin's unwillingness to fight dirty.
The Two-Headed Giant, whose two heads each have their own mind that don't always get along.
The Rock Monster, an ape-like being made up of living rock who eats rocks.
Various as the Knights, several near-identical knights who serve as background characters and comedy relief. Their features are obscured by their helmets, while the Queen's personal guard wear sunglasses and headsets in parody of the Secret Service. It is not uncommon for them to appear in their undergarments-wife beaters and boxer shorts-as a gag.

Episodes

Broadcast
My Knight and Me premiered in Wallonia (Belgium) on OUFtivi on August 28, 2016. It premiered in France on Télétoon+ on November 3, 2016 and on Ketnet in Flanders (Belgium) on December 24, 2016.

It made its English premiere on Boomerang UK and Ireland on November 1, 2016 and it premiered on January 2, 2017 on Cartoon Network US. It was pulled from the network after 33 episodes due to low ratings; the series later aired on Boomerang starting on April 3, 2017 until it was later removed off the channel on June 3, 2018.

My Knight and Me premiered on Boomerang Australia on March 4, 2017.

In Canada, Family Channel premiered on April 16, 2017, and on its sister channel Family CHRGD on July 2, 2018.

References

External links
 

2010s French animated television series
2017 French television series debuts
Belgian children's animated adventure television series
Belgian children's animated comedy television series
Belgian children's animated fantasy television series
French children's animated adventure television series
French children's animated comedy television series
French children's animated fantasy television series
French computer-animated television series
Animated television series about children
English-language television shows